Zhenlongxi station (a.k.a. Zhenlong West Station), is a station of  Line 21 of the Guangzhou Metro. It started operations on 28 December 2018. It was the initial terminus of the first phase of Line 21 until the extension to Yuancun on 20 December 2019.

The station has 2 underground island platforms with 3 tracks. Platform 1 is for trains heading east to Zengcheng Square, whilst platform 2 is for trains heading west to Yuancun, along with 2 platforms (platforms 3 and 4) and a track in the center.

Exits
The station has 3 exits, lettered A, B and D. Exit D is accessible. All exits are located on Zhenlong Avenue.

Gallery

References

Railway stations in China opened in 2018
Guangzhou Metro stations in Huangpu District